The Flavian Amphitheater, located in Pozzuoli, is the third-largest Roman amphitheater in Italy. Only the Roman Colosseum and the Amphitheatre of Capua are larger. It was likely built by the same architects who previously constructed the Roman Colosseum. The name "Flavian Amphitheater" is primarily associated with the Roman Colosseum.

History
It was begun under the reign of the emperor Vespasian and probably finished under the reign of his son Titus. The elliptical structure measures 147 x 117 meters (482 x 384 feet), with the arena floor measuring 72.22 x 42.33 meters (237 x 139 feet). The arena can hold up to 50,000 spectators. The interior is mostly intact and one can still see parts of gears, which were used to lift cages up to the arena floor. In 305, the arena was the setting for the persecutions of the patron saint of Pozzuoli, Saint Proculus, and the patron saint of Naples, Saint Januarius. After surviving being thrown to the wild beasts in the arena, the two were beheaded at the nearby Solfatara.

The Flavian Amphitheater is the second of two Roman amphitheaters built in Pozzuoli. The smaller and older amphitheater (Anfiteatro minore) has been almost totally destroyed by the construction of the Rome to Naples railway line. Only a dozen arches of this earlier work still exist. This lesser amphitheater measured 130 x 95 meters (427 x 312 feet).

The site of the structure was chosen at the nearby crossing of roads from Naples, Capua, and Cumae. It was abandoned when it was partially buried by eruptions from the Solfatara volcano. During the Middle Ages, the marble used on the exterior was stripped, but the interior was left alone and is perfectly preserved. Excavations of the site were performed 1839 to 1845, 1880 to 1882, and finally in 1947.

Gallery

See also
 List of Roman amphitheatres

References

Sources
 Crimaco, Luigi et al. Da Puteoli a Pozzuoli : scavi e ricerche sulla rocca del Rione Terra, Naples : Electa Napoli, 2003. (OCLC )
 De Caro, Stefano and Greco, Angela. Campania, Rome-Bari : G. Laterza, 1983, pp. 37–53. (OCLC )
 Maiuri, Amedeo. Studi e ricerche sull'Anfiteatro Flavio Puteolano. Napoli : G. Macchiaroli, 1955. (OCLC )
 Maiuri, Amedeo. I Campi Flegrei, Rome : Istituto poligrafico dello stato, 1958, pp. 19–61. (OCLC )
 Maiuri, Amedeo. L’anfiteatro flavio puteolano, in Memorie dell’Accademia di Lettere, Archeologia e Belle Arti di Napoli, Naples : G. Macchiaroli, 1955. (OCLC )
 Sirpettino, Mario. I campi flegrei. Guida storica, Naples : Edizioni scientifiche italiane, 1999. (OCLC )
 Puteoli. Studi di storia antica, vols.I-II, Pozzuoli : Azienda autonoma di soggiorno, cura e turismo di Pozzuoli, 1977–1978. (OCLC )
 I Campi Flegrei. Un itinerario archeologico. Venice : Marsilio, 1990. (OCLC )

External links

 Ulixes web site for Anfiteatro Flavio in Pozzuoli (Italian Language)
 Ulixes web site for Anfiteatro Flavio in Pozzuoli (English language - poorly translated)

Building projects of the Flavian dynasty
Roman amphitheatres in Italy
Ruins in Italy
Buildings and structures in the Metropolitan City of Naples
Ancient Roman buildings and structures in Pozzuoli
1st-century establishments in Italy
70s establishments in the Roman Empire